Flagler Palm Coast High School (FPCHS) is a high school located in Palm Coast, Florida, United States.  there are 128 teachers and 2,579 students. FPC has four flagship programs: International Baccalaureate, i3 New Tech Academy (project based learning academy) Aerounatical Academy (students earn up to 15 college credits from Embry Riddle University), and The FPC Fire Leadership Academy that works with the local Fire departments to offer coursework for students to leave high school prepared to take the state Fire exam and EMT exam. In 2017 FPC was recognized in the U.S. News National Rankings and was awarded the Bronze Medal.

School Mascot: Bulldogs

School Colors: Green and White

Programs of Study: 

 Advanced Manufacturing
 Aeronautics (Embry-Riddle Dual Enrollment)
 Allied Health (Medical Assisting)
 Carpentry
 Culinary
 Digital Media/Multimedia Foundations (Graphic Design)
 Digital Video Technology (TV Production)
 Entrepreneurship
 Fire Academy
 Veterinary Assisting

References

External links

Official Twitter
Flagler County School District

Public high schools in Florida
Schools in Flagler County, Florida
Palm Coast, Florida